The GSM Association (commonly referred to as 'the GSMA' or Global System for Mobile Communications, originally Groupe Spécial Mobile) is a non-profit industry organisation that represents the interests of mobile network operators worldwide. More than 750 mobile operators are full GSMA members and a further 400 companies in the broader mobile ecosystem are associate members. The GSMA represents its members via industry programmes, working groups and industry advocacy initiatives.

History 

The GSMA was formed in 1995 as the 'GSM MoU Association' as a body to support and promote mobile operators using the GSM (Global System for Mobile communications) standard for cellular networks. It traces its history back to a memorandum of understanding signed in 1987 by 13 operators in 12 countries that committed to deploying GSM for mobile services.

Membership and governance 
Full membership of the GSMA is open to licensed mobile operators using a GSM family technology. Approximately 750 such operators around the world are full GSMA members. Associate membership of the GSMA is open to non-operator companies active in the mobile ecosystem. These include handset and device makers, software companies, equipment providers and Internet companies, as well as organisations in industry sectors such as financial services, healthcare, media, transport and utilities. There are approximately 400 GSMA member companies in this category.

The GSMA board has 25 representatives from the world's largest operator groups and selected smaller operators, and is elected bi-annually. José María Álvarez-Pallete López, CEO of Telefónica Group, became GSMA Chairman in January 2022.,  

The present Director General of the GSMA, Mats Granryd, took office in January 2016.

Programmes and advocacy 
The GSMA manages industry programmes in collaboration with its members with the aim of achieving scale and interoperability for new mobile technologies. It has three active programmes: 'Future Networks' (promoting standards such as Rich Communication Services and Voice over LTE); 'Identity'; and the 'Internet of Things'.

It also runs industry working groups covering areas such as roaming and interconnection, fraud and security, and intellectual property, as well as various other specialist committees and groups.

The GSMA represents the mobile industry to governments and institutions where it advocates policy and regulatory positions on behalf of its members. Its stated goals in this area is to ensure that mobile telecoms "policy and regulatory frameworks are fair, flexible and future-proof"; that radio spectrum is made available for mobile services "in a timely and fair manner"; and to promote the use of mobile services in emerging markets.

As part of its Industry Purpose programme, the GSMA is supporting the United Nations' Sustainable Development Goals.

Events 

The GSMA's Mobile World Congress Barcelona (MWC Barcelona) is the largest annual exhibition and conference dedicated to the mobile industry, attracting more than 109,000 visitors in 2019. The event was first held in 1987.

Since 2006, the event has been hosted in Barcelona and is currently located at the Fira Gran Via and Fira Montjuïc venues. In 2019 the event was recognised, for the fourth time, as the Guinness World Record holder for the world's largest carbon-neutral tradeshow.

In addition to MWC Barcelona, the GSMA organises MWC Shanghai, MWC Las Vegas and the 'Mobile 360' series of regional events.

TAC/IMEI database 

The GSMA is the global administrator of Type Allocation Code (TAC), which is used to create the International Mobile Station Equipment Identity number that can uniquely identify wireless devices.

It allocates official IMEI number ranges to all manufacturers of 3GPP compliant devices and records these ranges and device model information in a database. It offers a device look up and identification service based on this database that allows authorised third-party organisations to identify the manufacturer and model of a mobile device using the IMEI.

References

External links 
 
 GSMA
 GSMA Intelligence – mobile data and statistics
 Mobile World Live – GSMA news service

GSMA Events
 GSMA Global Mobile Awards
 GSMA Mobile 360 Series
 MWC Africa
 MWC Barcelona
 MWC Las Vegas
 MWC Shanghai

GSM standard
Mobile phone industry
Telecommunications organizations